John Campbell (born 27 February 1946) is a Scottish former professional footballer. He played his entire career at Partick Thistle for whom he played 578 times in all competitions as a central defender (he is third on the club's all-time appearances list).

His honours are a Scottish Division Two winner's medal in 1970–71, a Scottish League Cup winner's medal in 1971, a Scottish First Division winner's medal in 1975–76 and a Glasgow Cup winner's medal in 1981. His testimonial game came in season 1980–81 which ended in a 6–6 draw.

See also 
List of one-club men

References

External links 

1946 births
Association football defenders
Living people
Partick Thistle F.C. players
Footballers from Airdrie, North Lanarkshire
Scottish Football League players
Scottish footballers
Outfield association footballers who played in goal